The women's 4 × 400 metres relay competition at the 2002 Asian Games in Busan, South Korea was held on 13 October at the Busan Asiad Main Stadium.

Schedule
All times are Korea Standard Time (UTC+09:00)

Records

Results

References

External links 
Results

Athletics at the 2002 Asian Games
2002